The Busan Transportation Corporation (Hangul:부산교통공사, Hanja:釜山交通公社) was established on January 1, 2006, following the abolition of the Busan Urban Transit Authority, which was founded in 1987. It currently operates the Busan Metro line 1- 4 and Busan Gimhae light Rail transit in Busan and Gimhae, South Korea. In addition, it provides all the information about the routes in Korean, English, Chinese, and Japanese.

Background 
The Corporation is governed by those of bureaucratic positions; with its system regulated by article 2 of the Auto Transportation Business Enforcement Law. It is responsible for all operations relating to the transportation system's construction and coherence. The corporation is led by the president, who oversees two departments (audit and safety & management) and four headquarters (planning, administration, general operations, and construction.)

Logo 
The Busan Transportation Corporation's logo depicts an image of a railway car in a square form.

Corporate purpose 
The corporation's purpose for its service is: “to develop an urban transit system, provide convenience for citizens, and promote a national prosperity through the construction of public transportation facilities in the transit zone of metro and operational rationalization.” Their vision for 2012 is to become a first-class corporation for the citizens with their slogan saying ‘Leading the paradigm of 21C urban railway operation.’ The corporation is motivated by three goals: “1) accomplish the balance of operation surplus 2) accomplish the first place in customer satisfaction 3) make a great occupation to work.” Which they plan to do by reducing accidents to zero, optimizing construction, and improving their organization, service, and finances.

Social Activities 
The Busan Transportation Corporation has extensions that do not relate to transportation, as they own their own football club: Busan Transportation Corporation FC.

See also
Busan Subway
Busan Subway Line 1
Busan Subway Line 2
Busan Subway Line 3
Busan Subway Line 4
Transportation in South Korea
Busan Transportation Corporation FC

References

External links
Busan Transportation Corporation  homepage 
Busan Transportation Corporation homepage 

Railway companies of South Korea
Busan Metro
Transport operators of South Korea
Transport in Busan
Companies based in Busan
Railway companies established in 2006
South Korean companies established in 2006